WBCW (89.7 FM) is a radio station  broadcasting a Christian adult contemporary format that is licensed to Upland, Indiana, United States. The station is owned by Taylor University. It operates as a simulcast of WBCL 90.3 FM in Fort Wayne, Indiana.

WBCW was assigned the WTUR call letters by the Federal Communications Commission (FCC) on August 11, 1995. On November 28, 2014, the station's call sign changed to the current WBCW.

References

External links

BCW
Taylor University
BCW
Contemporary Christian radio stations in the United States
Radio stations established in 1995
1995 establishments in Indiana